Standesamt Adelnau was one of the civil registration districts located in Kreis Adelnau of the Prussian province of Posen, created in October 1874, during Imperial Germany (1871–1918) and administered the communities of:

Civil registration offices in the Province of Posen